Larisa Alexeyevna Yudina (22 October 1945 – 8 June 1998) was a journalist and the editor of the opposition newspaper, Sovietskaya Kalmykia Sevodnya (Soviet Kalmykia Today). She was found dead on 8 June 1998, with multiple knife wounds and a fractured skull, in Elista, the capital of the Republic of Kalmykia.

Early life and education
Yudina was born in Elista, northwest of the Caspian Sea, on 22 October 1945. She studied journalism at Moscow State University.

Career
After graduating from the university with a degree in journalism, Yudina began to work as a correspondent for Molodyozh Kalmykii. She then worked as a correspondent for Sovietskaya Kalmykia Segodnya (Soviet Kalmykia Today). During her journalism career, Yudina suffered continuous harassment by local authorities. Later, she became the editor of this paper. She was also co-chairperson in the local branch of the Yabloko party.

Death
Prior to her death, she had published articles accusing Kirsan Ilyumzhinov, the president of Kalmykia, of corruption. Three men were convicted in connection with the murder, but the names of those who ordered the killing remain unknown. It was on her return from distributing newspapers that she was murdered. Her body was found dead beside a pond outside the city of Elista in Kalmykia on 7 July 1998.

Perpetrators
Two of the men who confessed to the murder, and were imprisoned, were aides to Kirsan Ilyumzhinov. However, no proof has yet been found that Kirsan himself ordered the crime.

References

External links
 Murder of Larisa Yudina: Chronicle of Events

1945 births
1998 deaths
Kalmykia
Assassinated Russian journalists
Journalists killed in Russia
Moscow State University alumni
People from Elista
Violence against women in Russia
20th-century Russian journalists